Walter Veltroni  (born 3 July 1955) is an Italian writer, film director, journalist, and politician, who served as the first leader of the Democratic Party within the centre-left opposition, until his resignation on 17 February 2009. He served as Mayor of Rome from June 2001 to February 2008.

Early life
Veltroni was born in Rome. His father, Vittorio Veltroni, an eminent RAI manager in the 1950s, died only one year later. His mother, Ivanka Kotnik, was the daughter of Ciril Kotnik, a Slovenian diplomat at the Holy See who helped numerous Jews and anti-fascists to escape Nazi persecution after 1943.

Political career
Veltroni joined the Italian Communist Youth Federation (FGCI) at the age of 15, and was elected Rome city councillor in 1976 as member of the Italian Communist Party, serving until 1981. He was then elected to the Italian Chamber of Deputies in 1987. As a member of the Italian Communist Party's national secretariat, in 1988, he played a leading role in the transformation into a social democratic party.

Veltroni, a professional journalist, was editor-in-chief of L'Unità, the newspaper of the Democratic Party of the Left from 1992 to 1996. He then ran as one of the leading members of The Olive Tree coalition in the 1996 general election. After The Olive Tree's victory, he served as Deputy Prime Minister and Minister for Cultural Assets and Activities from 1996 to 1998, joining 25 other PDS members in cabinet–the first (former) Communists to take part in government since 1947. Also in 1996, he joined the Bilderberg Meeting. In 1998, he resigned, subsequent to his election as National Secretary of the Democrats of the Left (DS). Despite his background as a journalist, he has been involved in controversial episodes related to freedom of expression. For example, in 2001, after the late night show Satyricon aired an interview that discussed indictments on links between the right-wing leader and the mafia, Marco Travaglio reported that Veltroni dispatched a messenger menacing the closure of the show.

Mayor of Rome
In 2001, Veltroni resigned as leader of the party after being elected Mayor of Rome. In May 2006, Veltroni was confirmed Mayor of Rome, easily defeating former Minister of Agriculture Gianni Alemanno, of National Alliance, obtaining an unprecedented 61.4% of the valid votes against the 37.1% achieved by his main opponent. The percentage of votes that supported Veltroni's second term in office was a record in local elections in Rome. Shortly before this confirmation, Veltroni had declared that he was going to leave politics at the end of his second term as Mayor.

In 2005, as mayor of Rome, he met in Washington, during a visit to the United States, then United States Senator (D-IL), Barack Obama, being one of his earliest supporters overseas. He wrote the preface to the Italian edition of The Audacity of Hope in 2007 and has been referred to as "Obama's European counterpart".

Veltroni was then widely considered one of the most popular centre left politicians in Italy, and often singled out for the leadership of the Democratic Party, despite his statements that he would not accept such position after his tenure as Mayor would end. In June 2007, DS leader Piero Fassino publicly asked Veltroni to run for the party leadership, offering support from all of his party. Several other Democratic Party leading members publicly stated their support for a possible candidacy of Veltroni. Furthermore, the strongest of his possible contenders, Pier Luigi Bersani, which polls showed as having a 50% support in center-north regions, withdrew to avoid a 'confusing candidacy'. Veltroni officially presented his candidacy for the leadership of the Democratic Party at a rally in Turin on 27 June 2007. At this occasion, he introduced the four key issues his programme would address: environment, generational pact, education, and public security.

Leader of the Democratic Party
Veltroni was elected as the first leader of the newly founded Democratic Party on 14 October 2007, winning an open primary with around 2.6 million votes, or 75.8%.

In 2007, Veltroni had some remarks against the Romanian immigrants, claiming that Italy has become "unlivable" since Romania joined the European Union, while before its entry, Rome was "the safest city in the world", bringing accusations of xenophobia from the Romanian press.

Following the defeat of Prodi's government in a January 2008 Senate vote, Veltroni led the Democratic Party into the April 2008 general election. Veltroni resigned as Mayor of Rome on 13 February 2008 to concentrate on the campaign.

He has been criticised for his over-frequentation of Rome socialites, and advised to focus on more practical problems.

On 17 February 2009, following clashes within the party and only a day after a heavy defeat of the Democratic Party in a local regional election in Sardinia, Veltroni announced his immediate resignation from his leadership post. The Constituent Assembly of the party subsequently convened on 21 February 2009 and elected Veltroni's former deputy Dario Franceschini as the new secretary.

Public image
On 28 September 2014, in Venice, Italy, the former Mayor of Rome was responsible of marrying George Clooney to Amal Alamuddin. The wedding was widely reported in the media.

Awards
In 2003, he received an honoris causa degree in Public Services by the John Cabot University of Rome. In 2006, Veltroni received the title of Cavaliere di Gran Croce (Knight of the Grand Cross) from President of the Italian Republic Carlo Azeglio Ciampi. He won the America Award of the Italy-USA Foundation in 2009.

Works
Veltroni has written a number of books on various topics, such as music, social issues, fiction, biographies and politics.
 1977 – Il PCI e la questione giovanile (The PCI and the Youth Issue)
 1978 – A dieci anni dal '68. Intervista con Achille Occhetto (Ten Years since '68: Interview with Achille Occhetto)
 1981 – Il sogno degli anni sessanta (The dream of the Sixties)
 1982 – Il calcio è una scienza da amare (Football is a science to be loved)
 1990 – Io e Berlusconi (e la Rai) (Berlusconi and me (and RAI))
 1992 – I programmi che hanno cambiato l'Italia (Programs that changed Italy)
 1992 – Il sogno spezzato. Le idee di Robert Kennedy (The broken dream. The ideas of Robert Kennedy)
 1992 – La sfida interrotta. Le idee di Enrico Berlinguer (The interrupted challenge. The ideas of Enrico Berlinguer)
 1994 – Certi piccoli amori (Certain small Loves)
 1995 – La bella politica (interview book) (Politics, the beautiful)
 1997 – Certi piccoli amori 2 (Certain Small Loves II)
 1997 – Governare da sinistra (To Govern from the Left)
 2000 – I care
 2000 – Forse Dio è malato. Diario di un viaggio africano (Perhaps God is sick: Diary of an African journey)
 2003 – Il disco del mondo. Vita breve di Luca Flores, musicista (The disk of the world. Short life of Luca Flores, musician)
 2004 – Senza Patricio (Without Patricio)
 2006 – La scoperta dell'alba (Discovery of the dawn)
 2007 – Preface to Barack Obama, L'audacia della speranza (The Audacity of Hope)
 2009 – Noi ("We")
 2019 -  Assassinio a Villa Borghese ("Murder at Villa Borghese" )

Filmography

Film director 
 Quando c'era Berlinguer (2014)
 I bambini sanno (2015)
 Gli occhi cambiano (2016)
 Indizi di felicità (2017)
 Tutto davanti a questi occhi (2018)
 C'è tempo (2019)

Electoral history

First-past-the-post elections

References

External links
 The Independent, article critics about Veltroni La dolce vita revisited: Rome's new emperor
  Repubblica.it: A brief portrait of Veltroni
 BBC News profile
 CityMayors profile
 World Mayors: Walter Veltroni
 Article about Walter Veltroni from Time magazine

|-

|-

|-

|-

1955 births
Living people
Politicians from Rome
People of Carinthian Slovene descent
Italian people of Slovene descent
Italian agnostics
Italian Communist Party politicians
Democratic Party of the Left politicians
Democrats of the Left politicians
Democratic Party (Italy) politicians
Culture ministers of Italy
Deputies of Legislature X of Italy
Deputies of Legislature XI of Italy
Deputies of Legislature XII of Italy
Deputies of Legislature XIII of Italy
Deputies of Legislature XIV of Italy
Deputies of Legislature XVI of Italy
MEPs for Italy 1999–2004
Mayors of Rome
Italian newspaper editors
Italian male journalists
Deputy Prime Ministers of Italy
L'Unità editors